Chief Josephine Oboh-MacLeod (born 18 July 1965) is a gallery owner in the United Kingdom. She is the first to stage an Afro-Celtic cultural show in Nigeria, at Fela Kuti New Afrika Shrine.

Early life 

Oboh-MacLeod was born into the family of Chief Major Humphrey Etafo Oboh. She is a sister to broadcaster/politician Mabel Oboh and Peter Oboh, the light former WBA/ British light heavy weight champion.

She studied at Government College, Ojo, Lagos, Newman Prep School, Boston,and earned a degree in hospitality at Newbury College, and a master's degree in Business Administration at University of Surrey. She studied art at London Art College, UK; interior/garden design at KLC School of Design, Chelsea Harbour, UK; and photography at Calumet Photography and Jessop Academy, UK. Epson Master Printing Course.

Art career

Oboh-Macleod has over 6,000 collections with forty years of been in the art world. She is the Artistic Director at Johfrim Art and Design (art exhibitor and seller) based in Milngavie, which hosts cross-cultural events and represents work by about 50 artists, approximately 70% of whom are from Africa.

She is the first African to establish an African art gallery, called "Timbuktu", in the UK and the only black African woman who owns an art culture centre in Scotland.

She has been part of art Exhibitions and has her works in international private collections such as Nike Art Gallery. She is a member of art groups, including the Society of Nigerian Artists. Milngavie, Bearsden and Dalmuir Art Club, Glasgow, Scotland, UK. She is the founder/ trustee of Jom Charity, Scottish charity board approved.Her charity and humanitarian work reaches her homeland of Nigeria, where she makes donations to the less privileged.

Politics

She is a United Kingdom politician and a member of The Scottish Conservative Party and a member of Black Tories who advocating the inclusion of more qualified black people in public positions such as parliament across the UK, especially in Scotland.

She was the secretary to Scottish Conservative Friends Of Black, Asian and Minority Ethnic (SCBAME). 

In 2022, Oboh-Macleod contested for councillorship election in Kirkintilloch East, North and Twechar under  Scottish Conservatives and Unionist Party.

She is the first woman of African descent to contest as the Scottish Conservative and Unionist Party’s councillorship candidate in East Dunbartonshire, Scotland, United Kingdom.

In 2023, As the newly Appointed first chairperson  of Conservatives Friends of Africa Scotland, UK (CFOAS),  an organisation, led by members, seeking to develop a strong meaningful relationship between the Conservative Party, the  African community in Scotland and Africa, she signed the Memorandum of understanding (MoU) between Conservative Friends of Africa, (the parent body) represented by Chairman Councillor Michael Gbadebo, and the affiliate Conservative Friends of Africa Scotland (CFofAS).

References

1965 births
Living people
Artists from Lagos
20th-century Nigerian artists
20th-century women artists
21st-century Nigerian artists
21st-century women artists
Scottish art collectors
Nigerian expatriates in the United Kingdom
Nigerian women artists